Alfred Ernest Fripp, KC (June 29, 1866 – March 25, 1938) was a Canadian lawyer and politician.

Born in Ottawa, Ontario, the son of Sidney Bowles Fripp, he was first elected to the House of Commons of Canada in the riding of Ottawa (City of) in the 1911 federal elections. A Conservative, he was re-elected in 1917 but was defeated in 1921. He was summoned to the Senate of Canada in 1933 representing the senatorial division of Ottawa, Ontario. He died in office in 1938, at his home in Ottawa.

In 1894, Fripp married Clementine Bell.

References

 Canadian Parliamentary Guide, 1910, EJ Chambers

External links
 
 

1866 births
1938 deaths
Canadian senators from Ontario
Conservative Party of Canada (1867–1942) MPs
Members of the House of Commons of Canada from Ontario
Canadian King's Counsel